Donald Webb may refer to:
Don Webb (writer) (born 1960), science fiction writer
Don Webb (American football) (born 1939), former American football defensive back
Don Webb (playwright), playwright and scriptwriter
Don Webb (diver), former Canadian diver and diving coach
Donald Eugene Webb (born 1931), fugitive